Maniyambath Mukundan, (born 10 September 1942) commonly known as M. Mukundan, is an Indian writer of Malayalam literature. Many of his early works are set in Mahé (Mayyazhi) which has earned him the moniker, Mayyazhiyude Kathakaaran. He is known to be one of the pioneers of modernity in Malayalam literature and Mayyazhippuzhayude Theerangalil, Daivathinte Vikrithikal, Kesavante Vilapangal and Pravasam are some of his notable works. 
He has received many honours including Vayalar Award, Sahitya Akademi Award, Kerala Sahitya Akademi Award. Crossword Book Award, JCB Prize and the Ezhuthachan Puraskaram, the highest literacy honour of the Government of Kerala. He is also a recipient of the Chevalier des Arts et des Lettres of the Government of France.

Biography
Mukundan was born on 10 September 1942 at Mahe, then a French overseas territory and now a part of Puducherry Union Territory in South India. Mukundan served as an official of the New Delhi office of the Embassy of France in Delhi. His first literary work was a short story published in 1961 while the first novel, Delhi was published in 1969. Mukundan has so far published 12 novels which include his later works such as Adithyanum Radhayum Mattu Chilarum, Oru Dalit Yuvathiyude Kadanakatha, Kesavante Vilapangal and Nritham and ten collections of short stories (which totals 171 in numbers till 2012). Adithyanum Radhayum Mattu Chilarum is a fictional story which dethrone the time from the narrative, it gives the readers a new method of writing. Oru Dalit Yuvathiyude Kadanakatha reveals how Vasundhara, an actress has been insulted in the course of acting due to some unexpected situations. It proclaims the postmodern message that martyrs are created not only through ideologies, but through art also. Kesavante Vilapangal (Kesavan's Lamentations) one of his later works tells the story of a writer Kesavan who writes a novel on a child named Appukkuttan who grows under the influence of E. M. S. Namboodiripad. Daivathinte Vikrithikal has been translated into English and published By Penguin Books India.

In 2008, Mukundan's magnum opus Mayyazhippuzhayude Theerangalil fetched him the award for the best novel published in the last 25 years. Three of his novels were made into feature films in Malayalam . He also wrote the script and one of them secured a state film award. His novel Pravasam (sojourn in non-native land) is the story of a Malayali whose journeys carry him around the world. Delhi Gadhakal (Tales from Delhi), a novel published in November 2011 is his recollections in India's capital city, New Delhi.

Mukundan served as the president of Kerala Sahitya Akademi from October 2006 until March 2010.

Awards and honours 

Mukundan received Kerala Sahitya Akademi Award for Novel in 1973 for Ee Lokam Athiloru Manushyan. This was followed by Sahitya Akademi Award in 1992 when Daivathinte Vikrithikal (God's Mischief) was selected for the award; the novel also received the N.V. Puraskaram. He received two honours in 1998, Chevalier des Arts et des Lettres of the Government of France and the Muttathu Varkey Award. He received the Vayalar Award in 2003, for Kesavante Vilapangal (Kesavan's Lamentations) and three years later, the English translation of Kesavan's Lamentations received the 2006 Crossword Book Award. The Government of Kerala awarded him their highest literary honour Ezhuthachan Puraskaram in 2018. He also received the Kerala Sahitya Akademi Fellowship the same year. He is also a recipient of M. P. Paul Award. In 2017, he received the T. K. Ramakrishnan Award, awarded as part of the Abu Dhabi Sakthi Awards, for his overall contribution.

Mukundan received the JCB prize for literature in 2021 for his book Delhi: A Soliloquy. His novel Nritham Cheyyunna Kudakal received the Basheer Award in 2022.

Works

Novels

Novelettes

Short story collections

Non-fiction
 Enthanu Aadhunikatha? (Calicut: Poorna, 1976)

Memoirs 
 Anubhavam Ormma Yathra (Calicut: Olive, 2014)

Works translated
 1999. On the Banks of the Mayyazhi. Trans. Gita Krishnankutty. Chennai: Manas.
 2002. Sur les rives du fleuve Mahé. Trans. Sophie Bastide-Foltz. Actes Sud.
 2002. God's Mischief. Trans. Prema Jayakumar. Delhi: Penguin.
 2004. Adityan, Radha, and Others. Trans. C Gopinathan Pillai. New Delhi: Sahitya Akademi.
 2005. The Train that Had Wings: Selected Short Stories of M. Mukundan. trans. Donald R. Davis, Jr. Ann Arbor: University of Michigan Press.
 2006. Kesavan's Lamentations. Trans. A.J. Thomas. New Delhi: Rupa.
 2007. Nrittam: A Malayalam Novel. Trans. Mary Thundyil Mathew. Lewiston, New York: Edwin Mellen Press.

References

Further reading

External links

 
 Works and Reviews
 Interview with M. Mukundan

1942 births
Living people
Malayali people
Indian male novelists
Indian male short story writers
Malayalam-language writers
Malayalam short story writers
Malayalam novelists
Recipients of the Sahitya Akademi Award in Malayalam
Recipients of the Kerala Sahitya Akademi Award
Chevaliers of the Ordre des Arts et des Lettres
Kerala State Film Award winners
20th-century Indian short story writers
People from Mahe district
Novelists from Puducherry
20th-century Indian novelists
21st-century Indian novelists
20th-century Indian male writers
21st-century Indian male writers
Recipients of the Abu Dhabi Sakthi Award